Phillip Alonzo Jones (born August 25, 1895) was an American football and basketball player and coach. He served as the head football coach at Mansfield University of Pennsylvania in 1921. Jones was also the head basketball coach at Mansfield during the 1921–22 season.

References

1895 births
Year of death missing
Basketball coaches from Maine
Maine Black Bears football players
Mansfield Mounties football coaches
Mansfield Mountaineers men's basketball coaches
Sportspeople from Bangor, Maine
Players of American football from Maine
Coaches of American football from Maine